Kamelia Petrova (Bulgarian: Камелия Петрова; born 1 May 2006) is a Bulgarian rhythmic gymnast. She is world champion in All-around with the Bulgarian team at the world championship 2022 in Sofia and world champion in final with 3 ribbons+2balls. She was All-Around, 5 balls and 5 ribbons' silver medalist at the 2021 European Championship and she's the champion in the senior team competition at the 2022 European Championships.

Personal life 
She started practicing rhythmic gymnastics at the age of 6 along her sister encouraged by her mother, who's a former athlete. Kamelia's favorite school subject is maths. Her motto is "God loves the brave".

Career

Junior 
She was selected for the 2020-2021 junior group, along Kristiana Doycheva, Suzan Pouladian, Maria Stamenova, Gergana Trendafilova and Aleksandra Vasileva. In February they competed at the 2021 Moscow Grand Prix, winning all the silver medals.  Followed by a bronze with 5 balls at the Deleanu cup. In June the team won 3 silver medals, All-Around (for the first time in 20 years), 5 balls and 5 ribbons.

Senior 
In 2022, when the girls of the previous senior group retired after becoming Olympic champions, she became a starter in the two routines since the World Cup in Pesaro, where the group won silver in the All-Around and  3 ribbons + 2 balls and bronze with 5 hoops. She also took part in the stages of Pamplona (bronze with 5 hoops and silver with  3 ribbons + 2 balls) and Cluji-Napoca (All-Around, 5 hoops and 3 ribbons + 2 balls gold). In June she was part of the group for the European Championship in Tel Aviv, she won gold in the senior team category along with Vaya Draganova, Zhenina Trashlieva, Sofia Ivanova, Rachel Stoyanov, Margarita Vasileva and the individuals Boryana Kaleyn and Stiliana Nikolova.

References 

2006 births
Living people
Bulgarian rhythmic gymnasts
Medalists at the Rhythmic Gymnastics European Championships
Gymnasts from Sofia
Medalists at the Rhythmic Gymnastics World Championships